Stephen Jones (born July 1957) is an English former professional footballer who played in the Football League as a right or left back or in central defence.

Steve was born in Eastbourne and played as a junior for Eastbourne United FC.

Jones left Hailsham County Secondary School to join Queens Park Rangers as an apprentice professional footballer in June 1973.

He made his first team debut (at left back) aged just 16 in a friendly match against the Jamaica national team in Kingston, Jamaica (May 1974).

Steve signed full professional forms for QPR at 17, but failed to represent the First XI following the managerial appointment of former Chelsea boss, Dave Sexton.

Following 180 appearances for the QPR reserves he eventually moved to Walsall in January 1979, for reported £30,000 fee. Six-months later he signed for Wimbledon who had just been promoted to Football League Division Three.

During the Division Three league match in 1982 between Wimbledon and Plymouth Argyle, Jones sustained a serious knee injury and was eventually forced to retire from the game in March 1983, aged 26.

References

1957 births
Living people
Sportspeople from Eastbourne
English footballers
Association football defenders
Queens Park Rangers F.C. players
Walsall F.C. players
Wimbledon F.C. players
English Football League players